Gajush is a village in the Lezhë County, north-western Albania. Following the local government reform of 2015, Gajush became a part of the municipality of Lezhë and is under the municipal unit of Shënkoll.

Demographic History
Gajush (Gajpi) is attested in the Ottoman defter of 1467 as a hass-ı mir-liva property in the vilayet of Dimitri Gjonima. The total number of households present in the settlement is missing, however, the following household heads are recorded: Gjon Bardi, Pal Dida, Lesh Trasha, Lumsha Aleksi, and Gjin Slani.

References

Administrative units of Lezhë
Villages in Lezhë County